This page shows the results of the Tennis Competition for men and women at the 1995 Pan American Games, held from March 11 to March 26, 1995, in Mar del Plata, Argentina.

Men's competition

Singles

Doubles

Teams

Women's competition

Singles

Doubles

Teams

Mixed Competition

Medal table

References
 Sports 123

Events at the 1995 Pan American Games
Pan American Games
1995
Panamerican Games
ATP